Viktar Kopach (Belarusian pronunciation: Viktar Kopach) is a Belarusian contemporary sculptor who lives and works in Minsk.

Biography 
He was born on 24 August 1970 in Kopachi, a village in the Masty district, Grodno Region of western Belarus. He moved to Minsk in 1986. His first exhibition was in 1993 at the Marc Chagall Art Center in Vitebsk, Belarus. A number of public space sculptures in Belarus, Russia, South Korea, China, Turkey, Brazil, Spain, Syria, Kazakhstan, Israel and Poland.

Public works 

 2014 –  "Circulation in Nature", Pedvale Open Air Museum, Pedvale, Latvia.
 2013 –  "Mother and Child", Ma'alot Tarshiha, Israel
 2013 –  "Circulation in Nature", Bursa, Turkey.
 2013 –  "Circulation in Nature", Istanbul, Turkey.Dzels. Akmens Simpozijs 
 2012 –  "Trinity",  Tongling, China,.
 2012 –  "Waterfall", Ma'alot Tarshiha, Israel
 2012 –  "Patroness of rhythmic gymnastics", Mersin, Turkey.
 2012 –  "Circulation in Nature", Luleburgaz, Turkey.
 2012 –  "Circulation in Nature", Kartal, Turkey.
 2011 –  "Dialogue", Oskemen, Kazakhstan.
 2011 –  "Waves", Boryeong, South Korea.
 2011 –  "Equilibrium",  Tsinghua University Centennial, Campus, Beijing, China.
 2010 –  "Sunrise", Nanqu Zhongshan, China,.
 2010 –  "Circulation in Nature", Izmir, Turkey.
 2010 –   "Nudes", Damascus, Syria.
 2009 –  "Sunrise",  Fu Jian Province, Huian, China.
 2009 –  "Equilibrium"  International Sculpture Park, Ürümqi, China.
 2009 –  "Reformer", Trakya University, Edirne – Turkey.
 2009 –  "A story of love" International Sculpture Park, Penza, Russia.
 2008 –  "Family"  Mosan Art Museum, Gaehwa Park, Boryeongsi, Chungnam, South Korea.
 2008 –  "Sand Glass", Changchun World Sculpture Park, Changchun, China.
 2008 –  "Mother and Child", Changchun sister city Sculpture Park, Changchun, China.
 2008 –  "The solidarity", Salihli – Manisa – Turkey.
 2008 –  "Circulation in Nature", Antalya – Turkey.
 2007 –  "Global warming", Escuela del Mármol de Fines, Andalucia – Spain.
 2005 – "Family", Cartódromo de Brusque, Santa Catarina – Brazil.
 2004 –  "Sand Glass", Cartódromo de Brusque, Santa Catarina – Brazil.
 2004 –  "Angel", Mogilev, Belarus.
 2003 –  "Shail", Mogilev State A. Kuleshov University, Belarus.
 1996 –  "Was reclining" Minsk, Belarus.

Awards 
 2015 – Third Prize, Kish Island international Sculpture symposium, Iran
 2013 – Third Prize, 2014 Qingdao International Horticultural Expo International Sculpture Competition China,.
 2004 –  Second Prize, Granite Sculpture Symposium, Mogilev, Belarus. Selected as an official representative of Belarus' for the building of the Monument to Mankind. (2002 – "Monument To Mankind" ).

References 

1970 births
Living people
Artists from Minsk
Belarusian sculptors
21st-century sculptors
20th-century sculptors
People from Masty District
Belarusian State Academy of Arts alumni